Ole Christian Andersen Nøstvig (10 June 1782 – 3 June 1852) was a Norwegian farmer and politician.

Nøstvig was born at Velfjord parish in the traditional district of Helgeland in Nordland, Norway. He was the son of Anders Knudsen Nøstvig and Inger Olsdatter. He took over the family farm in 1804 and farmed throughout life.
He was mayor of Brønnøysund for several years dating from 1838. He was a deputy representative in 1827 and was elected to the Norwegian Parliament in 1830, 1833, 1836, 1842 and 1845, representing the rural constituency of Nordlands Amt (now Nordland).

References

External links
 Brief history of Ole Christian Andreasen, MSS 2753 at L. Tom Perry Special Collections, Harold B. Lee Library, Brigham Young University

1782 births
1852 deaths
People from Brønnøy
Members of the Storting
Nordland politicians
Norwegian farmers